Lathrobium alesi is a species of rove beetle in the tribe Paederini in the genus Lathrobium that was discovered in 2010.

References 

Paederinae
Beetles described in 2010
Insects of China